Ornipholidotos emarginata is a butterfly in the family Lycaenidae. It is found in the Democratic Republic of the Congo and Tanzania. The habitat consists of forests.

Adults have been recorded on wing in March, December and May.

Subspecies
 Ornipholidotos emarginata emarginata (north-eastern Democratic Republic of the Congo)
 Ornipholidotos emarginata maxima Libert, 2005 (Tanzania)

References

Butterflies described in 1933
Ornipholidotos